Novaya Osinovka is a rural locality (a selo) in Veretyevskoye Rural Settlement, Ostrogozhsky District, Voronezh Oblast, Russia. The population was 457 as of 2010. There are 4 streets.

Geography 
Novaya Osinovka is located 14 km southwest of Ostrogozhsk (the district's administrative centre) by road. Nizhny Olshan is the nearest rural locality.

References 

Rural localities in Ostrogozhsky District